Delta Motorsport is an engineering consultancy. They are based near the Silverstone Circuit at Silverstone Park.

They are best known for designing and building the cars that competed in the Grand Prix Masters series.

Delta Motorsport provide all engineering support for Alan Docking Racing and their five Superleague Formula cars.
In recent years they have provided engineering support to Hitech Racing.

References

External links
 

British auto racing teams
Auto racing teams established in 2005
2005 establishments in the United Kingdom
Superleague Formula teams
FIA World Endurance Championship teams
24 Hours of Le Mans teams